Rondong Demang Stadium is a multi-use stadium in Tenggarong, Indonesia.  It is currently used mostly for football matches and is used as the home venue for Mitra Kukar of the Liga Indonesia. The stadium has a capacity of 5,000 spectators.

Tournament

References

External links
Stadium information

Football venues in Indonesia
Buildings and structures in East Kalimantan